Silent running is a stealth mode of operation for naval submarines. The aim is to evade discovery by passive sonar by eliminating superfluous noise:  nonessential systems are shut down, the crew is urged to rest and refrain from making any unnecessary sound, and speed is greatly reduced to minimize propeller noise. The protocol has been in use since the latter part of World War I, when hydrophones were invented to detect U-boats.

The propellers have a characteristic RPM band in which no cavitation noise arises. Since this rotation speed is usually relatively low, the first electric submarines had special "silent running" engines designed for optimum performance at reduced speed. These required less active cooling (further reducing noise), and were generally equipped with plain bearings rather than ball bearings. These engines were also acoustically decoupled from the hull, as they employed belt transmission rather than direct coupling to the propeller shaft.

Nuclear submarines can run even more quietly, at very low speeds only, by turning off active reactor cooling during silent running. The reactor is then only cooled by natural convection of the water.

See also
Acoustic signature
Acoustic quieting
Anti-submarine warfare

References

Submarine tactics